The Forgotten Realms Interactive Atlas was developed by ProFantasy Software, the creators of Campaign Cartographer for Wizards of the Coast, who publish the Forgotten Realms RPG setting.

Development
The Forgotten Realms Interactive Atlas, published by TSR, Inc. in 1999, was constructed using Campaign Cartographer.

The developers created vector version of the published maps for the Forgotten Realms Campaign Setting and included many new maps, including a globe of the entire Forgotten Realms world, Abeir-Toril.  There have been three updates published for the application that deliver over 800 maps. The maps were hyperlinked within a customised viewer, or could be accessed via an interactive globe. The product was discontinued after selling through its entire print in its first year.

Reviews
Backstab #19

References

Fictional atlases
Forgotten Realms